The Maze of Games is one of America's largest annual puzzlehunts, and is held at the Gen Con and Origins gaming conventions. Started in 1995 as an offshoot of LIVE/WIRE, the Maze of Games has been the largest event at one or both of those conventions every year since. It is created by game designers Mark Gottlieb, Mike Selinker, and Teeuwynn Woodruff. The event uses puzzle placards to lead attendees in a maze throughout the convention, and uses meta-puzzles to unite the puzzles into a final answer. The event is designed so that the thousands of attendees can all play at once.

The Maze of Games ran at Origins from 1995 to 2001, then moved to Gen Con under the names Gen Con Time Warp (2002–2003), Gen Con Monster Hunt (2004), and Gen Con Doomsday Rally (2005), the latter a tie-in with Hasbro's Risk game. The Maze of Games returned to Origins in 2004, the first year it was held at both conventions simultaneously.

The Monster Hunt appeared in part in the July 2005 issue of Games Magazine, the second Time Warp in the November 2005 issue, and the Doomsday Rally as a series beginning in the April 2006 issue.

Puzzle hunts
Mazes
Mike Selinker games